Utica Avenue may refer to:

 Utica Avenue, a major avenue in Brooklyn, New York City

New York City Subway stations
Crown Heights – Utica Avenue (IRT Eastern Parkway Line) at Eastern Parkway; serving the  trains
Utica Avenue (IND Fulton Street Line) at Fulton Street; serving the  trains
Reid Avenue (BMT Fulton Street Line), a demolished station on the BMT Fulton Street Line, at the intersection of Fulton Street, Utica Avenue, and the street formerly known as Reid Avenue (now Malcolm X Boulevard)

In addition, a Utica Avenue Line was proposed, but never built; see Proposed New York City Subway expansion (1929–1940)